Ruby May Stokes (born 4 September 2000) is an English actress. She appeared in the films Una (2016), Rocks (2019), and A Banquet (2021). On television, she is known for her role in the Netflix supernatural detective series Lockwood & Co. (2023). She also played Francesca, the sixth Bridgerton child, in the first two series of the streamer's period drama Bridgerton (2020–2022).

Early life
Stokes is from Hackney, East London. She has two younger brothers Clement and Seth who appeared in the ITV series Angela Black. She attended the BRIT School as well as the Young Actors Theatre Islington. She became a member of the London Youth Circus, part of the National Centre for Circus Arts.

Career
Stokes began her career as a child actress with a handful of small television roles before making her feature film debut in the 2016 drama Una as a young version of Rooney Mara's character. She appeared in Sarah Gavron's film Rocks in 2019. The following year, she was cast as Francesca, the sixth Bridgerton child, in the 2020 Shondaland-produced Netflix period drama Bridgerton, a role she would play in the first two series before exiting due to scheduling conflicts.

In 2021, Stokes voiced Kitty in the animated film Where is Anne Frank, and played Isabelle in the horror film A Banquet. It was announced in 2022 that Stokes would star as Lucy Carlyle in the Netflix adaptation of Lockwood & Co. and alongside Samantha Morton in the Paramount+ adaptation of The Burning Girls.

Filmography

Film

Television

Video games

References

External links

 Ruby Stokes at Curtis Brown

Living people
2000 births
21st-century English actresses
Actresses from London
British circus performers
People educated at the BRIT School
People from the London Borough of Hackney